The Little Billy films are a series of short films revolving around the character of a small boy, "Little Billy", portrayed by Billy Jacobs. Four films were made in 1914 and 1915: Little Billy's Triumph (1914), Little Billy's Strategy (1914), Little Billy's City Cousin (1914), and Billy's Cupidity (1915) (known as a Little Mr. Fixer outside of the United States). The shorts also starred Gordon Griffith, Charlotte Fitzpatrick, and Thelma Salter as regulars. Keystone Kop Edgar Kennedy appears in the first film.  Little Billy's Triumph was preserved by the Academy Film Archive in 2010.

References

Film serials